Iván Felipe Silva Morales (born 8 February 1996) is a Cuban judoka who competes in the 81 and 90 kg division. He won a silver medal at the 2015 Pan American Games and bronze medals at the 2014 and 2016 Pan American championships. He was eliminated in the second round at the 2016 Olympics.

He represented Cuba at the 2020 Summer Olympics.

He won one of the bronze medals in his event at the 2022 Judo Grand Slam Tel Aviv held in Tel Aviv, Israel.

References

External links

 
 
 
 

1996 births
Living people
Cuban male judoka
Judoka at the 2016 Summer Olympics
Olympic judoka of Cuba
Pan American Games medalists in judo
Pan American Games silver medalists for Cuba
Judoka at the 2015 Pan American Games
Judoka at the 2019 Pan American Games
Judoka at the 2014 Summer Youth Olympics
Sportspeople from Matanzas
Medalists at the 2019 Pan American Games
Medalists at the 2015 Pan American Games
Judoka at the 2020 Summer Olympics
20th-century Cuban people
21st-century Cuban people